Wajdi Omran Saied Dawo (born October 29, 1988 in Tripoli) is a Libyan basketball player. He competed as a member of the Libya national basketball team at the FIBA Africa Championship 2009.

Dawo averaged 5 points and 3 rebounds per game in the tournament while playing in seven of Libya's eight games.  In his first extended action for the team, Dawo scored a game high 15 points for the Libyans against Angola in the eighth finals.

External links
FIBA Archive info

References

1988 births
Living people
Libyan men's basketball players
People from Tripoli, Libya